Blodwell Junction railway station was a station in Llanyblodwel, Shropshire, England. The station opened on 18 April 1870 as Llanyblodwel before being renamed in 1904. The station closed to passengers on 15 January 1951 and closed completely on 6 January 1964. There is no trace of the station today.

Present day
The tracks remained in use to serve Nantmawr Quarry until 1984 when the entire line was closed by British Rail and the line was left in situ from Blodwell Junction to near Oswestry. The line has since been cleared and is now under the co-ownership of both the Cambrian Heritage Railway and the recently reformed Tanat Valley Light Railway.

References

Further reading

Disused railway stations in Shropshire
Railway stations in Great Britain closed in 1870
Railway stations in Great Britain closed in 1951
Former Cambrian Railway stations